The Reformist Party (formally and less-commonly known as the Reformist Republican Party; ; 1912–1931) was a political party in early 20th-century Spain. It was founded in 1912 by Melquíades Álvarez, Gumersindo de Azcárate, and José Ortega y Gasset. In the 1914 election, the party elected 11 members to the Congress of Deputies. The party ceased to exist during the Second Republic, which began in 1931.

Election results

References

Liberal parties in Spain
Radical parties
Republican parties in Spain
Political parties established in 1912
1912 establishments in Spain
José Ortega y Gasset